The Gotham Independent Film Award for Breakthrough Series – Long Form is one of the annual Gotham Independent Film Awards and honors series with episodes over 40 minutes. Until 2019, the award honored a new "continuing or limited series with episodes running 30 minutes or longer". It was first awarded in 2015.

Winners and nominees

2010s

2020s

References

External links
 

Breakthrough Series - Long Form
Awards established in 2015